Barea exarcha is a moth of the family Oecophoridae. This species was first described by Edward Meyrick in 1883. It is found in Australia and New Zealand.

References

Oecophorinae
Moths of Australia
Moths of New Zealand
Moths described in 1883
Taxa named by Edward Meyrick